J.W. Patterson House is a historic home and office located at Fairmount, Grant County, Indiana.  The house was built between 1887 and 1890, and is a two-story, brick dwelling with Queen Anne and Stick Style design elements. It has a slate covered hipped roof with gables and wraparound front porch.  Also on the property is a one-story detached cottage that served as a doctor's office.  It was the home and office of prominent local physician Dr. J.W. Patterson.

It was listed on the National Register of Historic Places in 1979, with a boundary increase in 1985.

References

Houses on the National Register of Historic Places in Indiana
Queen Anne architecture in Indiana
Houses completed in 1890
Buildings and structures in Grant County, Indiana
National Register of Historic Places in Grant County, Indiana
1890 establishments in Indiana